The Ministry of Plantation Industries is a ministry in the Government of Sri Lanka.

List of Plantation Industries Ministers
The Minister of Plantation Industries is an appointment in the Cabinet of Sri Lanka.

Parties

References

External links
 Ministry of Plantation Industries
 Government of Sri Lanka

Plantation Industries
Plantation Industries